Distin Cottage is a historic cure cottage located at Saranac Lake in the town of Harrietstown, Franklin County, New York.  It was built about 1920 and is a two-story, "L" shaped wood frame single-family dwelling with Colonial Revival style details.  It has a hipped roof with a clipped gable and dormers.  It features a cure porch measuring 8 feet by 10 feet.  It was designed by architect William G. Distin for his father, photographer William L. Distin.

The cottage was rented by Albert Einstein when he first came to Saranac Lake the summers of 1936 and 1937.

It was listed on the National Register of Historic Places in 1992.

References

Houses on the National Register of Historic Places in New York (state)
Colonial Revival architecture in New York (state)
Houses completed in 1920
Houses in Franklin County, New York
National Register of Historic Places in Franklin County, New York